The Last Enemy is a five-part BBC television drama starring Benedict Cumberbatch and featuring Robert Carlyle and Max Beesley. It first aired on 17 February 2008.

Plot
Set in a recognisable, near-future London beset by terrorism and illegal immigration, The Last Enemy features the introduction of "TIA" (Total Information Awareness), a centralised database that can be used to track and monitor anybody, effectively by putting all available government and corporate – i.e. credit card and bank activity, phone use, internet use, purchases, rentals, etc. – information in one place.

The story deals with a political cover-up centred on a sanctioned but secret medical experiment run amok with key members of the government trying desperately to hide all evidence of their experimental batch of vaccine that seems to be causing a deadly virus. The complex story unspools to reveal the moral, social and privacy concerns of this hypothetical TIA system in a post-7/7 world, including such control mechanisms familiar to both real life and science fiction as retinal scans, fingerprint identification and ubiquitous camera and cellphone surveillance footage.

The story is told through the eyes of a mathematical genius, Stephen Ezard, who is portrayed as a recluse showing some signs of obsessive-compulsive disorder. But the shy genius overcomes his own inhibitions to burrow into a highly compromised British government using his brilliance and their TIA system only to find himself ultimately trapped by the people he most trusts, and to learn he is a pawn in manipulative Security State machinations which take the people he most loves from him and compromise him forever.

Viewing figures

Distribution

 The Last Enemy aired in the United States on PBS stations on Masterpiece Contemporary.
 In Australia, The Last Enemy TV series commenced airing on free-to-air-TV on ABC1 (the national public television channel) from 8:30pm on 19 July 2009 and concluded on 16 August 2009.
 The Last Enemy aired on TVO in Ontario, Canada from 9:00 pm on 1–29 April 2009
 The Last Enemy aired weekly in Denmark on DR1 from 10:45 pm on 26 January 2012.
 The Last Enemy is available on Amazon Prime Video and on YouTube. As of 2020, it is available on the STV Player in Scotland. In January 2023, it was made available on ITVX and Britbox in the UK.

References

External links
 
The Last Enemy at the BBC

BBC Television shows
2008 British television series debuts
2008 British television series endings
Television shows set in London
2000s British drama television series
Television series by WGBH
PBS original programming